Rudbar Sara or Rudbarsara (also Romanized as Rūdbār Sarā; also known as Rūd Sarā and Rūdsarā-ye Chūbar) is a village in Chubar Rural District, Haviq District, Talesh County, Gilan Province, Iran. At the 2006 census, its population was 128, in 34 families.

References 

Populated places in Talesh County